María Teresa Ramírez Gómez (born August 15, 1954, in Mexico City) is a Mexican former freestyle and backstroke swimmer. She represented Mexico at two consecutive Summer Olympics, starting in Mexico City (1968). She won the bronze medal in the Women's 800m Freestyle event at the 1968 Summer Olympics.

External links

 

1954 births
Living people
Mexican female swimmers
Mexican female freestyle swimmers
Female backstroke swimmers
Swimmers at the 1967 Pan American Games
Swimmers at the 1968 Summer Olympics
Swimmers at the 1971 Pan American Games
Swimmers at the 1972 Summer Olympics
Olympic swimmers of Mexico
Olympic bronze medalists for Mexico
Swimmers from Mexico City
Olympic bronze medalists in swimming
Medalists at the 1968 Summer Olympics
Pan American Games bronze medalists for Mexico
Pan American Games medalists in swimming
Central American and Caribbean Games gold medalists for Mexico
Central American and Caribbean Games medalists in swimming
Competitors at the 1970 Central American and Caribbean Games
Medalists at the 1971 Pan American Games
20th-century Mexican women
21st-century Mexican women